In the field of search and rescue, mission control centres (MCCs) are a type of clearinghouse responsible for receiving and distributing distress signal alerts from emergency position-indicating radiobeacon stations. MCCs are a core component of the international satellite system for search and rescue - Cospas-Sarsat.

The functions of an MCC are:
 to collect, store and sort the data from local user terminals (LUTs) and other MCCs;
 to provide international and national data exchange within the Cospas-Sarsat system; and
 to distribute alert and location data to associated rescue coordination centres (RCCs) or SAR points of contact (SPOCs)

As of 13 May 2009, there are 29 MCCs around the world.

List of mission control centres
Canadian Mission Control Centre (CMCC)
United Kingdom Mission Control Centre (UKMCC)
United States Mission Control Center (USMCC)
Pakistan Mission Control Centre (PMCC)

References

See also
Cospas-Sarsat

Rescue